Leptolalax ventripunctatus (known as Yunnan Asian toad or more elaborately, speckle-bellied metacarpal-tubercled toad) is a frog species in the family Megophryidae. It is known from Mengla County in Yunnan, southern China, from Phongsaly Province in northern Laos, and from Tam Dao in northern Vietnam. Its natural habitats are subtropical moist lowland forests and rivers. Its status is insufficiently known.

Tadpoles are larger in terms of length, .

References

ventripunctatus
Amphibians of China
Amphibians of Laos
Amphibians of Vietnam
Amphibians described in 1990
Taxonomy articles created by Polbot
Taxobox binomials not recognized by IUCN